The 1980 BMW Challenge was a women's tennis tournament played on outdoor grass courts at Devonshire Park in Eastbourne in the United Kingdom that was part of the Colgate Series category of the 1980 WTA Tour. It was the seventh edition of the tournament and was held from 16 June through 21 June 1980. Second-seeded Tracy Austin won the singles title and earned $22,000 first-prize money.

Finals

Singles
 Tracy Austin defeated  Wendy Turnbull 7–6(7–3), 6–2
It was Austin's 7th singles title of the year and the 17th of her career.

Doubles
 Kathy Jordan /  Anne Smith defeated  Pam Shriver /  Betty Stöve 6–4, 6–1

Prize money

Notes

References

External links
 International Tennis Federation (ITF) tournament edition details

BMW Championships
Eastbourne International
BMW Championships
BMW Championships
1980 in English women's sport